The Cobb Point Bar Light (also called Cobb Island Bar Light) was a screw-pile lighthouse located in the Potomac River.

History
A light at Cobb Point was first requested in 1875 to mark the entrance to the tricky channel leading into the Wicomico River (not to be confused with the river of the same name on the Eastern Shore). After two additional requests, funds were finally appropriated in 1887. Construction was delayed, however, and the light was not commissioned until Christmas 1889.

A fire in 1939 caused by light keeper Matthew Wicke, resulted in heavy damage, and in the following year the house was torn down, replaced by a beacon set on the same foundation.

References

Cobb Point Bar Light, from the Chesapeake Chapter of the United States Lighthouse Society

External links

Lighthouses completed in 1889
Lighthouses in Maryland
Lighthouses in the Chesapeake Bay
Transportation buildings and structures in Charles County, Maryland